Christina Malone (born 30 January 1963) is an English actress. She is best known for portraying the roles of Mo McGee in Brookside and Mimi Maguire in Shameless, both broadcast on Channel 4. She was also a housemate on the sixth series of Celebrity Big Brother in January 2009.

Early life
Malone was born on 30 January 1963 in Toxteth, Liverpool, the daughter of Olwyn and Frank Malone. She attended Liverpool Institute High School for Girls and Childwall College.

Career 
Malone played Mo McGee in Brookside from 1993 until 1998 and Mimi Maguire on Shameless from 2005 until 2013. Other television roles include playing a nurse called Bobbie in Victoria Wood's dinnerladies.

On 2 January 2009, Malone entered the  Celebrity Big Brother house to compete in the sixth series. She was the seventh person to enter and was immediately picked up on her loudness. On 16 January, Malone was the second person to be evicted from the Celebrity Big Brother House. From 8–11 September 2009, Malone directed and starred in Kerry Williams' play MeeT ThE DeAN's at the Unity Theatre, Liverpool.

Malone appeared on Celebrity Four Weddings in December 2010, which she won. She also appeared in Scousers in St Helens on 26 October 2010.

In 2016, she was a contestant on Celebrity MasterChef. In May 2019 Malone played Elaine McDermott in the 5Star prison drama Clink. In August 2019, she was a contestant on Celebs on the Farm and was first to be eliminated.

Personal life
Malone runs her own acting school, To Be Frank Productions, in Manchester, where she lives. The school produces plays in local Liverpool theatres such as the Everyman Theatre. The drama school is named after her late father, Frank Malone. She also used to run an agency with Dean Sullivan called DSTM. Malone has stated that she has obsessive compulsive disorder and bipolar disorder.

Malone's oldest daughter Dannielle, who she gave birth to in 1982, is also an actress, and has appeared in Hollyoaks.

In May 2012, Malone was declared bankrupt.

In 2013, she gave birth to a second daughter named Flame Chase at age 50.

In March 2019, Malone pleaded guilty to contempt of court, having shared a social media post which purported to reveal the new identity of Jon Venables, one of two boys who murdered James Bulger, contrary to a court order. She was given an eight-month prison sentence which was suspended for two years.

In October 2019, Malone announced, via Twitter, that she and her husband Paul had separated after 11 years together. They reconciled in February 2020.

Stage and Screen Credits

Stage

References

External links

1963 births
Actresses from Liverpool
English soap opera actresses
English television actresses
Living people
People educated at Liverpool Institute High School for Girls
People with bipolar disorder
People with obsessive–compulsive disorder
People from Toxteth